Manolescu, Prince of Thieves (German: Manolescu, der Fürst der Diebe) is a 1933 German comedy crime film directed by Georg C. Klaren and Willi Wolff and starring Iván Petrovich, Alfred Abel, Ellen Richter and Mady Christians. It was shot at the Johannisthal Studios in Berlin and on location in St. Moritz. The film's sets were designed by the art director Hans Jacoby. It was produced and released just as the Weimar Republic was giving way to Nazi Germany.

Synopsis
An elegant man-about-town leads a secret life as a jewel thief. An insurance company hires an investigator to try and track down the man behind the robberies that have led to large payouts, but in Paris he quickly sees through her scheme. Eventually he is an caught and sentenced to prison in Germany, but manages to escape.

Cast
 Iván Petrovich as George Manolescu
 Alfred Abel as 	Jan Hendriks, Generaldirektor Introp Versicherung
 Ellen Richter as Olivia, seine Frau
 Mady Christians as 	Comtesse Maria Freyenberg
 Hilde Hildebrand as 	Marion Lamond
 Fritz Kampers	Max Krause, ehemaliger Rennfahrer
 Hubert von Meyerinck as 	Der Kellner im Hotel Ritz
 Olly Gebauer as 	Die Dame im Wartesaal
 Kurt Lilien as 	Der Nachtportier

See also
 Manolescu's Memoirs (1920)
 Manolescu (1929)

References

Bibliography 
 Giesen, Rolf. The Nosferatu Story: The Seminal Horror Film, Its Predecessors and Its Enduring Legacy. McFarland, 2019.
 Klaus, Ulrich J. Deutsche Tonfilme: Jahrgang 1933. Klaus-Archiv, 1988.

External links 
 

1933 films
Films of the Weimar Republic
German comedy films
1933 comedy films
German crime films
1933 crime films
1930s German-language films
Films directed by Georg C. Klaren
Films directed by Willi Wolff
Tobis Film films
German black-and-white films
1930s German films
Films shot at Johannisthal Studios
Films shot in Switzerland
Films set in Paris
Films set in Berlin
Films set in Vienna
Films set in Switzerland

de:Manolescu, der Fürst der Diebe